EnServe Group Limited (formerly Spice Limited) is a support services company headquartered in Macclesfield, United Kingdom which provides infrastructure services to the utility sector. Formerly listed on the London Stock Exchange and a constituent of the FTSE 250 Index, it was wholly owned by the private equity company Cinven between 2010 and 2016, when it was bought by Rubicon.

History
The Company was founded by Simon Rigby in 1996 as a management buy out from Yorkshire Electricity initially trading as Freedom Maintenance. It was first listed on the Alternative Investment Market in 2004. In 2006 it bought Inenco and ParGas and Apollo Heating, in 2007 it purchased Gas Heating UK and in 2008 it acquired Saturn Energy, Energy 2000,  British Power International  and the National Industrial Fuel Efficiency Service. The Company transferred to the main list of the London Stock Exchange in 2008. Spice plc was unlisted in December 2010 after a buyout by European investment group Cinven and renamed as Spice ltd. In September 2011 Spice Limited was renamed EnServe Group Limited.
Rubicon purchased Enserve Group from Cinven in December 2015 installing a new management team under Mark Perkins (ex Shepherd Group) who very quickly carried out a full Group restructure, establishing each business on a viable standalone basis, and creating development strategies for each. The successful divestment then began with Metro Rod to Franchise Brands PLC in a reverse takeover of the AIM listed business run by Stephen Helmsley in March 2017, followed by Meter-U to M Group Services, run by Jim Arnold in June 2017 and finally Freedom Group itself in April 2018 following a year of profitable growth and development, to NG Bailey Group run by David Hurcomb. This marked the end of PE ownership for each of the businesses and the successful execution of the Rubicon strategy to re-home each business with long term strategic owners. The Analytics business Evolve was retained by Rubicon partners until it was acquired by Gentrack as part of their growth strategy.

Operations
The Company has the following divisions:
Electricity
Water
Analytics

References

External links
 Official site
 British Power International Official site
 Freedom Group Official site
 H2O Water Services Official site
 Meter-U Official site
 Metro Rod Official site
 Evolve Analytics Official site

Companies based in Cheshire
Companies established in 1996